Scurcola Marsicana is a comune and town in the province of L'Aquila, in the Abruzzo region of central Italy.

It is located at the feet of Mount San Nicola, on the western rim of the former Fucine Lake.

History
The most ancient findings of human presence in the area date from the 9th-8th centuries BC.

The name is of Lombard origin, and is first mentioned around 1150 AD.

In the nearby, in the Palentine Plains, was fought the Battle of Tagliacozzo between Conradin of Hohenstaufen and Charles I of Anjou. The city was also the seat of a massacre of the local population by the Piedmontese troops in the aftermath of the unification of Italy.

Main sights
Church of Sant'Egidio
Church of Sant'Antonio
Church of SS. Trinità
Church of Maria SS. della Vittoria
Abbey of Santa Maria della Vittoria
Castello Orsini (Orsini Castle)

Twin towns
 Passau, Germany

References

 
Marsica